= Nigeria Christian Civil Chaplain Corps =

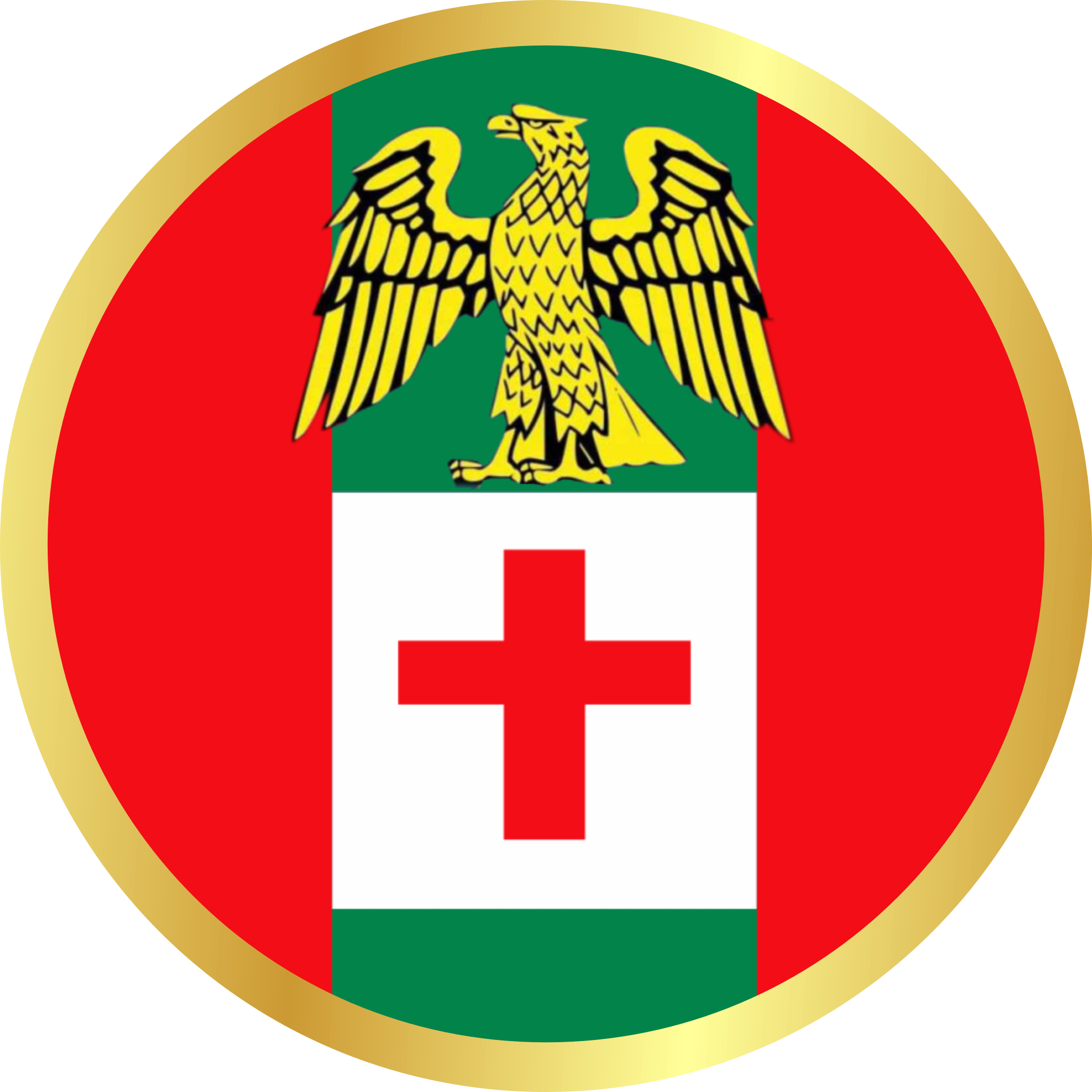
- Abbreviation: NCCC
- Formation: April 27, 2016; 10 years ago
- Type: Civil chaplaincy
- Legal status: Active, faith-based youth and civil organization
- Headquarters: Abuja, Nigeria
- Region served: Nigeria
- Corps Commanding Officer: Chaplain Daniel Joe Alimi
- Key people: National Executive Council
- Website: www.hqnccc.org.ng

Nigeria Christian Civil Chaplain Corps (NCCC) is a Nigerian faith-based organization established in 2016 that provides chaplaincy services and is involved in peacebuilding initiatives and community outreach activities.

Nigeria Christian Civil Chaplain Corps Ranks

| Rank | Abbreviation | Rank Insignia |
|---|---|---|
| Corps Commanding Officer | CCO | Combat rank insignia of the Nigeria Christian Civil Chaplain Corps (NCCC) Ceremonial rank insignia of the Nigeria Christian Civil Chaplain Corps (NCCC) |
| National Commandant | NC | Combat rank insignia of the Nigeria Christian Civil Chaplain Corps (NCCC) Ceremonial rank insignia of the Nigeria Christian Civil Chaplain Corps (NCCC) |
| Corps Public Relations Officer | CPRO | Combat rank insignia of the Nigeria Christian Civil Chaplain Corps (NCCC) Ceremonial rank insignia of the Nigeria Christian Civil Chaplain Corps (NCCC) |
| Commanding Officer | CO | Combat rank insignia of the Nigeria Christian Civil Chaplain Corps (NCCC) Ceremonial rank insignia of the Nigeria Christian Civil Chaplain Corps (NCCC) |
| Commandant | Comdt. | Combat rank insignia of the Nigeria Christian Civil Chaplain Corps (NCCC) Ceremonial rank insignia of the Nigeria Christian Civil Chaplain Corps (NCCC) |
| Deputy Commandant | DC | Combat rank insignia of the Nigeria Christian Civil Chaplain Corps (NCCC) Ceremonial rank insignia of the Nigeria Christian Civil Chaplain Corps (NCCC) |
| Assistant Chaplain | AC | Combat rank insignia of the Nigeria Christian Civil Chaplain Corps (NCCC) Ceremonial rank insignia of the Nigeria Christian Civil Chaplain Corps (NCCC) |
| Regular Chaplain | RC | Combat rank insignia of the Nigeria Christian Civil Chaplain Corps (NCCC) Ceremonial rank insignia of the Nigeria Christian Civil Chaplain Corps (NCCC) |

Nigeria Christian Civil Chaplain Corps Flags

| Flag | Description | Official Flag |
|---|---|---|
| First Official Flag | Official flag of the Nigeria Christian Civil Chaplain Corps. | First official flag of the Nigeria Christian Civil Chaplain Corps |
| Second Official Flag | Official flag of the Nigeria Christian Civil Chaplain Corps. | Second official flag of the Nigeria Christian Civil Chaplain Corps |

== History ==
The NCCC was founded on April 27, 2016, and has since been engaged in national security advocacy and faith-based engagement in public affairs.

== Federal Recognition ==
The organization was formally recognized by the Federal Government through the Federal Ministry of Youth Development as a youth-serving peacebuilding organization.

== Activities ==
The Nigeria Christian Civil Chaplain Corps has held national security prayer summits and public engagements that bring together religious leaders, government representatives, and security stakeholders.in public discussions on peace, unity, and approaches to addressing insecurity in Nigeria.

== Leadership ==
The Nigeria Christian Civil Chaplain Corps is led by Chaplain Daniel Joe Alimi, who serves as the Corps Commanding Officer of the organization.
